Dypsis is a genus of flowering plants in the family Arecaceae. They are slender, evergreen palms with yellow flowers carried in panicles amongst the pinnate leaves. Many Dypsis species have aerial branching (above the main trunk), a rare growth habit among palms. Some have marcescent leaves that remain attached after death and trap litter for nutrients.

Etymology 
The etymology is obscure but may be related to the Greek  ‘I dive’ or  ‘diver’. The species are native to Tanzania, Madagascar, and various islands in the Indian Ocean (Mauritius and Comoros). A few are naturalized in other regions, especially in the Caribbean.

Selected species

References

 
Arecaceae genera
Trees of Africa
Taxonomy articles created by Polbot